Kristian Vesalainen (born 1 June 1999) is a Finnish professional ice hockey forward HIFK of the Finnish Liiga. Vesalainen was drafted by the Winnipeg Jets in the first round, 24th overall, in the 2017 NHL Entry Draft.

Playing career
Vesalainen originally played as a youth in his native Finland, appearing up to the Junior A level with HIFK before opting to continue his development in Sweden with Frölunda HC on 27 August 2015. Vesalainen made his professional debut at the senior level with Frölunda in the Swedish Hockey League during the 2015–16 season. After an initial loan period to return to Finland during the 2016–17 season with HPK of the Liiga, Vesalainen made his move permanent in agreeing to a one-year deal with HPK on 28 April 2017. In his first year of eligibility, Vesalainen was selected in the first round, 24th overall, by the Winnipeg Jets at the 2017 NHL Entry Draft on 23 June 2017.

In the 2017–18 season, despite his age Vesalainen impressively secured a top line role with HPK. With the club out of playoff contention and while leading the HPK in scoring with 19 goals and 39 points, Vesalainen was loaned for the remainder of the season to league leaders Oulun Kärpät on 21 February 2018. Kärpät would eventually win the Liiga championship, with Vesalainen scoring 8 points in 18 playoff games. On 26 August 2018, Vesalainen signed a three-year, $4.476 million entry-level contract with the Jets, which included an out clause that would permit him to play in Europe during the 2018–19 season if he did not make the team's roster during the training camp.

Vesalainen made his NHL debut on 4 October 2018 in a 5–1 win over the St. Louis Blues. He played 8:12 minutes of ice time and earned one assist. On 22 November, the Jets assigned Vesalainen to Jokerit of the Kontinental Hockey League (KHL).

On 21 October 2020, Vesalainen returned to HPK on loan from the Winnipeg Jets, until the commencement of the delayed North American 2020–21 season. In the following  season, Vesalainen scored his first NHL goal against the Nashville Predators on 23 October 2021. He appeared in a career best 53 regular season games with the Jets, totalling just 3 points, before he was re-assigned to close out the season with the Manitoba Moose in the AHL.

As an impending restricted free agent with the Jets, Vesalainen chose to return to Europe by signing a one-year contract with Swedish club, Malmö Redhawks of the SHL, on 23 May 2022. He opted to return to his home country in November that same year.

Career statistics

Regular season and playoffs

International

References

External links
 

1999 births
Living people
Finnish ice hockey left wingers
Frölunda HC players
HPK players
Jokerit players
Manitoba Moose players
National Hockey League first-round draft picks
Oulun Kärpät players
Winnipeg Jets draft picks
Winnipeg Jets players
Ice hockey people from Helsinki